Erica Vexler (died 30 April 2011) was a Chilean journalist, editor, and television presenter best known for her reporting for the magazine Ercilla – of which she was editor in 1966 and subsequently subeditor until 1970 – and for presenting the program Erika Vexler 600 on Canal 13. In 1968, the  presented her with the Lenka Franulic Award, which she shared with C. Machado.

In 1970, after the victory of Salvador Allende in the presidential election, she moved to Israel, where she served as a correspondent for Televisa.

Colonia Dignidad case
Vexler was one of the first journalists to investigate and publish a series of denunciations about the conditions that existed in the former Colonia Dignidad, in co-authorship with Osvaldo Murray and Juan Ehrmann. These incited the first judicial inquiry into the colony between 1966 and 1968, without conclusive results. Such reports appeared in Ercilla during the 1960s:

References

20th-century births
2011 deaths
20th-century journalists
Chilean expatriates in Israel
Chilean Jews
Chilean journalists
Chilean television presenters
Chilean women journalists
Deaths from emphysema
University of Chile alumni
Year of birth missing
Chilean women television presenters